The Director of the British Museum is the head of the British Museum in London, a post currently held by Hartwig Fischer. He is responsible for that institution's general administration and reports its accounts to the British Government. The actual governance of the British Museum, however, is delegated to its board of trustees.

At the museum's inception its most senior member of staff was called "principal librarian". The job title became "director and principal librarian" in 1898, and "director" in 1973, on the separation of the British Library from the museum.

Principal Librarian of the British Museum (1756)
 1756–1772: Gowin Knight 
 1772–1776: Matthew Maty 
 1776–1799: Charles Morton 
 1799–1827: Joseph Planta 
 1827–1856: Sir Henry Ellis
 1856–1866: Sir Anthony Panizzi
 1866–1873: John Winter Jones
 1873–1888: Sir Edward Augustus Bond 
 1888–1898: Sir Edward Maunde Thompson

Director and Principal Librarian of the British Museum (1898)
 1898–1909: Sir Edward Maunde Thompson 
 1909–1931: Sir Frederic George Kenyon 
 1931–1936: Sir George Francis Hill 
 1936–1950: Sir John Forsdyke 
 1950–1959: Sir Thomas Downing Kendrick 
 1959–1969: Sir Frank Francis 
 1969–1974: John Wolfenden

Director of the British Museum (1973)
 1974–1977: Sir John Pope-Hennessy 
 1977–1992: Sir David M. Wilson
 1992–2002: Robert Anderson
1999–2001 Suzanna Taverne (managing director)
 2002–2015: Neil MacGregor, 
 2016–present: Hartwig Fischer

List of deputy directors

 1971–1983: Maysie Webb; first incumbent
 1983–1997: Jean Rankine
 1997–2002:
 2002–2013: Andrew Burnett
2002–2005: Dawn Austwick
 2013–present: Joanna Mackle
 2013–present: Jonathan Williams

See also
 List of Trustees of the British Museum

References

Directors
Lists of office-holders in London